Ben Gordon (born 7 October 1985) is a former Scottish footballer who played as a central defender.

Career
Gordon began his footballing career at St Mirren's Academy, but was released in 2004. Shortly after, he went to the University of Strathclyde and played for Strathclyde University FC, an amateur club. Four years later, he went back to senior terms, signing with Dumbarton. He signed a new deal with the club in May 2009, being appointed captain a year later.

On 27 June 2011, Gordon signed with Alloa Athletic. He established himself as a first-team regular, being promoted twice in his first two seasons at the club. On 10 August 2013 he made his professional debut, in a 1–0 home win over Livingston.

In July 2015 after four-years with Alloa, Gordon moved to Scottish Championship rivals Livingston. Gordon joined St Mirren on a one-year deal in June 2016, leaving Livingston following their relegation to Scottish League One.

On 16 September 2016, a week after making his debut for St Mirren, Gordon moved on loan to Alloa Athletic, signing until January 2017. Gordon's loan was cut short, when new Saints boss Jack Ross recalled him in October 2016. Gordon was released by St Mirren in May 2017, following the end of his contract. He then signed for East Fife, before leaving the side in September 2017.

Career statistics

Honours
Dumbarton

Scottish Division Three (fourth tier): Winners 2008–09

References

External links

1985 births
Living people
Footballers from Glasgow
Scottish footballers
Association football defenders
Dumbarton F.C. players
Alloa Athletic F.C. players
Livingston F.C. players
Scottish Football League players
Scottish Professional Football League players
St Mirren F.C. players
East Fife F.C. players
New Zealand Football Championship players
Alumni of the University of Strathclyde